Screen Songs, formerly known as KoKo Song Car-Tunes, are a series of animated cartoons produced at the Fleischer Studios and distributed by Paramount Pictures between 1929 and 1938. Paramount brought back the sing-along cartoons in 1945, now in color, and released them regularly through 1951. Two of Paramount's one-shot cartoons quietly revived the format later: Candy Cabaret (1954) and Hobo's Holiday (1963).

History
The Screen Songs are a continuation of the earlier Fleischer series Song Car-Tunes in color. They are sing-along shorts featuring the famous "bouncing ball", a sort of precursor to modern karaoke videos. They often featured popular melodies of the day. The early Song Car-Tunes were among the earliest sound films, produced two years before The Jazz Singer. They were largely unknown at the time because their release was limited to the chain of 36 theaters operated by The Red Seal Pictures Company, which was equipped with the early Lee DeForest Phonofilm sound reproduction equipment. The Red Seal theater chain—formed by the Fleischers, DeForest, Edwin Miles Fadiman, and Hugo Riesenfeld—went from the East Coast to Columbus, Ohio.

Between May 1924 and September 1926, the Fleischers released 36 Song Car-Tunes series, with 19 using the Phonofilm sound-on-film process. The films included Oh Mabel, Come Take a Trip in My Airship, Darling Nelly Gray, Has Anybody Here Seen Kelly?, and By the Light of the Silvery Moon. Beginning with My Old Kentucky Home (1926), the cartoons featured the "follow the bouncing ball" gimmick, that lead the audience singing along with the film. The other 17 films in the Song Car-Tunes series were silent, designed to be shown with live music in movie theaters.

The Fleischers were ahead of the sound revolution, and just missed the actual change when Red Seal Pictures filed for bankruptcy in the fall of 1926.

Releases after Red Seal Pictures
In 1928, the Weiss Brothers reissued through their Artclass Pictures company and other independent distributors a number of the silent "Ko-Ko Song Car-tunes" with new animation created for the beginnings, removing the original titles and opening original footage.

 For Me and My Gal (1926)
 I Love to Fall Asleep (1926)
 In My Harem (1926)
 Just Try to Picture Me (1926)
 My Sweetie (1926)
 Old Pal (1926)
 Alexander's Ragtime Band (1926)
 The Sheik of Araby (1926)
 Annie Laurie (1926)
 Oh! How I Hate to Get Up in the Morning (1926)
 When I Lost You (1926)
 Margie (1926)
 When the Midnight Choo-Choo Leaves for Alabam (1926)
 Oh! What a Pal Was Mary (1926)
 Everybody's Doing It (1926)
 Yak-A-Hula-Hick-A-Doola (1926)
 My Wife's Gone to the Country (1926)
 My Old Kentucky Home (1926)
 Beautiful Eyes (1926)
 Finiculee Finicula (1926)
 Micky (1926)
 When the Angelus Was Ringing (1926)
 When I Leave This World Behind (1926)
 Tumbledown Shack in Athlone (1927)
 The Rocky Road to Dublin (1927)
 Call Me Up Some Rainy Afternoon (1927)
 Oh I Wish I Was in Michigan (1927)

New contract with Paramount Pictures
The Fleischers signed a new contract with Paramount Pictures in late 1928. Beginning in February 1929, the song cartoons returned under a new name, Screen Songs, using the Western Electric sound-on-film process. The first was The Sidewalks of New York (East Side, West Side) released on 5 February 1929. In the 1930s, the shorts began to feature such musical guest stars as Lillian Roth, Ethel Merman, Cab Calloway, Rudy Vallée, The Mills Brothers, the Boswell Sisters, and others. The series, which eventually focused on many of the "Big Bands" of "The Swing Era" continued until 1938. In 1945, Famous Studios, successors to the Fleischers, revived the Screen Songs as an all animated series. The earliest Screen Song released as part of the Noveltoons series, When G.I. Johnny Comes Home, was released on February 2, 1945.

Filmography

Fleischer Studios

Famous Studios
"Start your day with a song, and sing the whole day through. Even while you're busy working, Do just like the birdies do! Though the day may be long, You never will go wrong. Off key, On key, any old key, Just start your day with a song!"-Opening to the Famous Studios Screen Song shorts.

For all the shorts, the musical arrangements were made by Winston Sharples.

{| class="wikitable sortable"
|-
!  style="text-align:center; width:150px;"|Film
!  style="text-align:center; width:150px;"|Theme
!  style="text-align:center; width:150px;"|Song
!  style="text-align:center; width:150px;"|Director
!  style="text-align:center; width:150px;"|Story
!  style="text-align:center; width:150px;"|Animation
!  style="text-align:center; width:150px;"|Scenics
!  style="text-align:center; width:150px;"|Original release date
|-
|The Circus Comes to Clown
|Circus|"The Man on the Flying Trapeze"
|I. Sparber
| "align="center" rowspan="2"|Bill TurnerLarz Bourne
|Tom JohnsonFrank Endres
|Anton Loeb
|December 26, 1947
|-
|Base Brawl
|Baseball|"Take Me Out to the Ball Game"
| "align="center" rowspan="6"|Seymour Kneitel
|Dave TendlarTom Golden
|Robert Connavale
|January 23, 1948
|-
|Little Brown Jug
|Cider|"Little Brown Jug"
|Bill TurnerLarry Riley
|Orestes CalpiniMorey RedenBill Hudson
|Tom Ford
|February 20, 1948
|-
|The Golden State
|California|"California, Here I Come"
|Larz BourneLarry Riley
|Dave TendlarBill Hudson
|Robert Little
|March 12, 1948
|-
|Winter Draws On
|Bird Migration|"Alabamy Bound"
|Larz BourneBill Turner
| "align="center" rowspan="3"|Al EugsterIrving Spector
|Tom Ford
|March 19, 1948
|-
|Sing or Swim
|Beach|"By the Beautiful Sea"
|I. KleinLarry Riley
|Robert Connavale
|June 16, 1948
|-
|Camptown Races
|Blackface Acts|"Camptown Races"
|Bill TurnerLarry Riley
|Tom Ford
|July 30, 1948
|-
|The Lone Star State
|Texas|"Deep in the Heart of Texas"
|I. Sparber
|Larz Bourne
|Dave TendlarMorey Reden
|Robert Connavale
|August 20, 1948
|-
|Readin', Ritin' and Rhythmetic
|School|"School Daze"
| "align="center" rowspan="3"|Seymour Kneitel
|I. Klein
|Al EugsterBill Hudson
|
|October 22, 1948
|-
|The Funshine State
|Florida|"Tallahassee"
|Larz Bourne
|Dave TendlarMorey Reden
|Shane Miller
|January 7, 1949
|-
|The Emerald Isle
|Ireland|"MacNamara's Band"
|I. Klein
|Al EugsterBill Hudson
|Tom FordRobert Owen
|February 25, 1949
|-
|Comin' Round the Mountain
|Hillbillies|"She'll Be Comin' 'Round the Mountain"
|I. Sparber
|Bill Turner
|Tom JohnsonFrank Endres
|Anton Loeb
|March 11, 1949
|-
|The Stork Market
|Newborn Babies|"Pretty Baby"
|Seymour Kneitel
|Bill TurnerLarry Riley
|Al EugsterWm. B. Pattengill
| "align="center" rowspan="2"|Shane Miller
|April 8, 1949
|-
|Spring Song
|Spring|"Spring Song"
| "align="center" rowspan="2"|I. Sparber
|I. Klein
|Myron WaldmanLarry Silverman
|June 3, 1949
|-
|The Ski's the Limit
|Switzerland|"I Miss My Swiss, My Swiss Miss Misses Me"
|Bill TurnerLarry Riley
|Dave TendlarTom Golden
|Robert Connavale
|June 24, 1949
|-
|Toys Will Be Toys
|Toys|"Oh, You Beautiful Doll"
| "align="center" rowspan="3"|Seymour Kneitel
|I. Klein
|Myron WaldmanGordon Whittier
|Robert Little
|July 29, 1949
|-
|Farm Foolery
|Autumn/Winter Harvest|"Shine On, Harvest Moon"
|Larz Bourne
| "align="center" rowspan="2"|Al EugsterBill Hudson
| "align="center" rowspan="4"|Tom Ford
|August 5, 1949
|-
|Our Funny Finny Friends
|Fishes|"Three Little Fishies"
|Larz BourneLarry Riley
|August 26, 1949
|-
|Marriage Wows
|Wedding|"For Me and My Gal"
| "align="center" rowspan="2"|I. Sparber
|Bill TurnerLarry Riley
|Myron WaldmanGordon Whittier
|September 16, 1949
|-
|The Big Flame Up
|Firefighting|"There'll Be a Hot Time in the Old Town Tonight"
| "align="center" rowspan="2"|I. Klein
|Dave TendlarMartin Taras
|September 30, 1949
|-
|Strolling Thru the Park
|1890s Parks|"Strolling Thru the Park"
|Seymour Kneitel
|Myron WaldmanLarry Silverman
|Robert Little
|November 4, 1949
|-
|The Big Drip
|Noah's Ark'''
|"It Ain't Gonna Rain No Mo'"
| "align="center" rowspan="2"|I. Sparber
|Larz BourneLarry Riley
|Myron WaldmanNick Tafuri
| "align="center" rowspan="2"|Tom Ford
|November 25, 1949
|-
|Snow Foolin|Winter|"Jingle Bells"
|I. Klein
|Myron WaldmanGordon Whittier
|December 16, 1949
|-
|Blue Hawaii
|Hawaii|"Blue Hawaii"
| "align="center" rowspan="2"|Seymour Kneitel
| "align="center" rowspan="2"|Larz Bourne
|Al EugsterWm. B. Pattengill
|Lloyd Hallock Jr.
|January 13, 1950
|-
|Detouring Thru Maine
|Maine|"The Maine Stein Song"
|Al EugsterBill Hudson
|Robert Connavale
|February 17, 1950
|-
|Short'nin' Bread
|Baked Goods|"Shortenin' Bread"
| "align="center" rowspan="2"|I. Sparber
| "align="center" rowspan="2"|Larz BourneLarry Riley
|Myron WaldmanGordon Whittier
|Anton Loeb
|March 24, 1950
|-
|Win, Place and Show Boat
|Mississippi Riverboat|"Waiting for the Robert E. Lee"
|Al EugsterWm. B. Pattengill
|Robert Connavale
|April 28, 1950
|-
|Jingle Jangle Jungle
|Africa|"Civilization (Bongo Bongo Bongo)"
|Seymour Kneitel
|Joe StultzLarry Riley
|Myron WaldmanLarry Silverman
|Tom Ford
|May 19, 1950
|-
|Heap Hep Injuns
|Native Americans|"My Pony Boy"
| "align="center" rowspan="2"|I. Sparber
|Larz Bourne
|Tom JohnsonGeorge Rufle
|Anton Loeb
|June 30, 1950
|-
|Gobs of Fun
|Sailors|"Strike Up the Band (Here Comes a Sailor)"
|Larry RileyJoe Stultz
|Al EugsterIrving Spector
|Robert Owen
|July 28, 1950
|-
|Helter Swelter
|Summer|"In the Good Old Summer Time"
|Seymour Kneitel
|Larz BourneLarry Riley
|Al EugsterWm. B. Pattengill
|Tom Ford
|August 25, 1950
|-
|Boos in the Nite
|Halloween|"Pack Up Your Troubles"
|I. Sparber
|Joe StultzLarry Riley
|Myron WaldmanNick Tafuri
| "align="center" rowspan="2"|Anton Loeb
|September 22, 1950
|-
|Fiesta Time
|Mexico|"El Rancho Grande"
| "align="center" rowspan="2"|Seymour Kneitel
|I. Klein
|Myron WaldmanLarry Silverman
|October 20, 1950
|-
|Fresh Yeggs
|Prisons|"Give My Regards to Broadway"
|Larz Bourne
|Myron WaldmanNick Tafuri
| "align="center" rowspan="2"|Robert Owen
|November 17, 1950
|-
|Tweet Music
|Birds|"Let's All Sing Like the Birdies Sing"
|I. Sparber
|Joe Stultz
|Al EugsterGeorge Rufle
|February 9, 1951
|-
|Drippy Mississippi
|Mississippi River|"M-I-S-S-I-S-S-I-P-P-I"
|Seymour Kneitel
|Larz Bourne
|Myron WaldmanGordon Whittier
| "align="center" rowspan="2"|Anton Loeb
|April 13, 1951
|-
|Miners Forty-Niners
|Miners|"Clementine"
| "align="center" rowspan="2"|I. Sparber
|I. Klein
|Myron WaldmanLarry Silverman
|May 18, 1951
|-
|Sing Again of Michigan
|Michigan'|"I Want to Go Back to Michigan Down on the Farm"
|Larz Bourne
|Al EugsterGeorge Rufle
|Robert Owen
|June 29, 1951
|}

See also
 The Golden Age of American animation
 Kartunes

Notes

References

External links
Screen Songs at Don Markstein's Toonopedia. Archived from the original on March 29, 2017.

Further reading
 Leslie Cabarga, The Fleischer Story (Da Capo Press, 1988)
 Leonard Maltin, Of Mice and Magic: A History of American Animated Cartoons'' (Penguin Books, 1980, revised edition 1987)

Film series introduced in 1929
Fleischer Studios short films
Famous Studios series and characters
Television series by U.M. & M. TV Corporation
Animated film series
Sing-along